Sheikh Hasina Medical College may refer to:

 Sheikh Hasina Medical College, Jamalpur, a government medical college established in 2014 in Jamalpur, Bangladesh
 Sheikh Hasina Medical College, Tangail, a government medical college established in 2014 in Tangail, Bangladesh
 Sheikh Hasina Medical College, Habiganj, a government medical college established in 2017 in Habiganj, Bangladesh